Neuvic may refer to the following places in France:

Neuvic, Corrèze, a commune in the department of Corrèze
Neuvic, Dordogne, a commune in the department of Dordogne
Neuvic-Entier, a commune in the department of Haute-Vienne